The Mount Baldy Ski Lifts, or "Baldy", is a ski resort in the western United States in southern California.  east-northeast of Los Angeles in San Bernardino County, it is located on Mount San Antonio—Mount Baldy in the San Gabriel Mountains.

History
The vintage ski lifts were installed in 1952 by Harwood Developments. They were operated as Mt Baldy Ski Lifts Inc. and managed by Herbert Leffler from 1953 until his retirement in 1969.  The resort was sold to an investment group in 1969.

In 1987, Bob Olson proposed a project to make Baldy "The Disneyland of the Mountains."

Facilities

Baldy spans  designated for skiing with a  vertical drop.

The ski area is multi-directional, with portions of the main ski area facing south or southwest and other portions north-facing. Thunder Mountain areas serviced by Chair 3 are north-facing, resulting in longer-lasting snow conditions. The majority of the steep Chair 1 terrain down to the base area and parking lot along with the Chair 4 portion of the resort faces west and south, resulting in frequent spring conditions and corn snow. Snow on the lower portion of the mountain is typically hard with afternoon softening on north-facing slopes due to brief thaw/shade conditions.  In times of abundant snowfall, prior to complete solar melting of the snowpack on south-facing slopes, there is sunny skiing on the slopes from Chair 4 down to the base area.

The annual snowfall of Mt Baldy is highly variable, due to southern California mountain weather patterns. In some seasons there is insufficient natural snow to operate the ski area for more than a few days (if at all). In other seasons, particularly certain El Niño years, several feet of snow can accumulate and provide for good daily operation of the ski area and widespread off-piste skiing.

Lifts
Chairs #1 and #3 were built in 1952 by Ringer Chairlifts and featured double swiveling chairs which allowed riders to stand up when unloading. When unloading riders just had to stand up in the landing area and the swiveling chairs would automatically move out of the way and pass the rider. The double swiveling chairs had some design flaws. The chair design did not take in account riders' natural instinct to move away from the unloading area quickly. Ringer Chairlifts went out of business just two years later.

In 1975 Swiss company GMD Mueller was contracted to upgrade the existing lifts reusing the old towers and to build chairs #2 and #4.

Gallery

References

External links

 

Ski areas and resorts in California
Sports venues in San Bernardino County, California
San Gabriel Mountains